The Charles William Jones House (also known as John B. Jones) is a historic home in Pensacola, Florida. It is located at 302 North Barcelona Street. On December 20, 1977, it was added to the U.S. National Register of Historic Places.

References

External links

 Escambia County listings at National Register of Historic Places
 Florida's Office of Cultural and Historical Programs
 Escambia County listings
 Charles William Jones House

Houses on the National Register of Historic Places in Florida
Buildings and structures in Pensacola, Florida
National Register of Historic Places in Escambia County, Florida
Houses in Escambia County, Florida
Vernacular architecture in Florida
Houses completed in 1869